A Civil War: Army vs. Navy is a book published in 1996 by popular sports author John Feinstein. In it, Feinstein writes about his experiences spending time with both American football teams of the United States Military Academy (Army) and the United States Naval Academy (Navy) during the 1995 season, leading up to the annual Army–Navy Game at Veterans Stadium in Philadelphia.

It follows the members of each football team throughout the season, through the highs and lows of the season.

References

1995 NCAA Division I-A football season
1996 non-fiction books
American football books
Army Black Knights football
English-language books
Navy Midshipmen football
Back Bay Books books